The 1930-31 French Rugby Union Championship of first division was won by le Toulon, which defeated Lyon OU in the final.

The Championship was contested by 40 clubs divided in 8 pools.

This season was unusual because 12 teams, including some of the more prestigious, were excluded from the tournament by Championship, and found the (Union française de rugby amateur) that arrange their championship.

They were:
Bayonne, Biarritz, SBUC, Carcassonne (demi-finaliste 1930), Grenoble, Limoges, FC Lyon, Stade Nantais, Pau, US Perpignan, Stade Français and Toulouse.

In January 1931 another new club join the UFRA, the US Narbonne.

Instead the Stadoceste, did not participated at any championship.

The clubs Libourne, Pamiers (pourtant qualifié l’année précédente pour la seconde phase, les pools of 3) and Saint-Girons SC, left the scene, so were 15 the team promoted in the championship:

FC Auch, Bordeaux EC, AS Bort (champion Honneur 1930), US Bressanne (Bourg-en-Bresse), Brive, Dax, Stade Illibérien (Elne), Montauban, Stade Nay, FC Oloron, Stade Pézenas, Racing Paris, Thuir, Tyrosse and Valence

First round
in  bold the qualified to second round

Second round

In bold the clubs qualified to next round

Quarterfinals

Semifinals

Final

Other competitions

L'UA Libournaise won the second division championship ("Honneur")  winning against l'Union Athlétique de Gujan-Mestras, 8–5.

In the final of the French Championship Second Series (third division) Toulouse SC defeated Saint-Girons, 17–0.

In third series, le C.O. l Ceret beat the AS Bourse (Paris), 6–4.

L'AS Montferrand winning against le Toulouse Olympique Employés Club in the final, 12–6, won the first Frantz Reichel Cup (French Juniors Championship ).

The UFRA Tournament was won by Toulouse.

Sources 
 L'Humanité, 1930-1931
 Compte rendu de la finale de 1931, sur lnr.fr
 finalesrugby.com
 Encyclopédie du rugby - mise - jour périodique

1931
1930–31 rugby union tournaments for clubs
Championship